Omer Reingold is an Israeli computer scientist. He is the Rajeev Motwani professor of Computer Science in the Computer Science Department at Stanford University and the director of the Simons Collaboration on the Theory of Algorithmic Fairness. He received a PhD in computer science at Weizmann in 1998 under Moni Naor. He received the 2005 Grace Murray Hopper Award for his work in finding a deterministic logarithmic-space algorithm for st-connectivity in undirected graphs. He, along with Avi Wigderson and Salil Vadhan, won the Gödel Prize (2009) for their work on the zig-zag product. He became a Fellow of the Association for Computing Machinery in 2014 "For contributions to the study of pseudorandomness, derandomization, and cryptography."

Selected publications
.

References

External links
 Omer Reingold's personal homepage
 Omer Reingold's homepage at Simon's Institute, Berkeley
 Omer Reingold's homepage at Weizmann Institute
 Omer Reingold's homepage at Stanford University
 His Grace Murray Hopper award

Year of birth missing (living people)
Living people
Grace Murray Hopper Award laureates
Academic staff of Weizmann Institute of Science
Theoretical computer scientists
Gödel Prize laureates
Israeli computer scientists
Fellows of the Association for Computing Machinery